Tetracha floridana, known generally as the Florida metallic tiger beetle or Florida big-headed tiger beetle, is a species of big-headed tiger beetle in the family Carabidae. It is found in North America.

Distribution and Habitat
Only found along the Gulf coast of Florida from Dixie County to the Florida Keys. It inhabits coastal saltwater marshes and mudflats.

References

Further reading

External links

 

Cicindelidae
Articles created by Qbugbot
Beetles described in 1916